Serach may refer to:

A Hebrew feminine given name, also spelled Serah or Serakh:
Serach, the daughter of the biblical patriarch Asher about whom many midrashim are told
Serach (Khazar), the wife of the Khazar ruler Sabriel who influenced, according to the Schechter Letter, the latter's decision to convert to Judaism
Serach, Germany, a neighborhood of Esslingen am Neckar
Schloss Serach, home of Alexander of Württemberg (1801–1844) from which the Serach Circle of poets was named 
Šěrach, the Sorbian spelling of Schirach

See also